The Cathedral Basilica of Florida is the main Roman Catholic church building of Florida, Uruguay. It is the see of the Roman Catholic Diocese of Florida since 1956.

History 
At this place there was originally another, smaller church, the Chapel of Our Lady of Luján of El Pintado, which in 1805 was elevated to parish church. (Note that Our Lady of Luján was declared patron saint of Uruguay by Pope Pius IX in 1930).

In 1887 was built the current temple; over its door reads the Latin expression Domus Dei nostri.

Nowadays it is the National Sanctuary of the Virgin of the Thirty-Three; the image of Our Lady of the Thirty-Three, patron saint of Uruguay, is venerated here.

In 1988, during his second pastoral visit to Uruguay, Pope John Paul II visited this cathedral.

See also
 List of Roman Catholic cathedrals in Uruguay
 Roman Catholic Diocese of Florida

References

External links
 Diocese of Florida

Religion in Florida Department
Buildings and structures in Florida Department
Florida
Roman Catholic churches completed in 1887
Renaissance Revival architecture in Uruguay
Basilica churches in Uruguay
19th-century Roman Catholic church buildings in Uruguay